Nilphamari-2 is a constituency represented in the Jatiya Sangsad (National Parliament) of Bangladesh since 2001 by Asaduzzaman Noor of the Awami League.

Boundaries 
The constituency encompasses Nilphamari Sadar Upazila.

History 
The constituency was created in 1984 from a Rangpur constituency when the former Rangpur District was split into five districts: Nilphamari, Lalmonirhat, Rangpur, Kurigram, and Gaibandha.

Members of Parliament

Elections

Elections in the 2010s

General Election 2018

Asaduzzaman Noor was re-elected unopposed in the 2014 general election after opposition parties withdrew their candidacies in a boycott of the election.

Elections in the 2000s

Elections in the 1990s

References

External links
 

Parliamentary constituencies in Bangladesh
Nilphamari District